Eugene Augustine Garvey (October 6, 1845 – October 22, 1920) was an American prelate of the Catholic Church. He was the first Bishop of Altoona, serving from 1901 until his death in 1920.

Biography

Early life and education
Eugene Garvey was born on October 6, 1845 in Carbondale, Pennsylvania, to Michael and Catherine (née Boylan) Garvey. His parents were both Irish immigrants, and his father was a rope worker for the Delaware and Hudson Railway and later the Pennsylvania Coal Company. One of five children, Garvey had a sister Margaret (later Sister Eugenia) who joined the Sisters of Charity and became superior of their convent in San Francisco.

In 1850, Garvey moved with his family from Carbondale to nearby Dunmore, later graduating from Scranton High School. After teaching for two years, Garvey entered St. Charles College, a minor seminary at Ellicott City, Maryland, in 1865 to begin his preparation for the priesthood. He completed his theological studies at St. Charles Borromeo Seminary in Philadelphia. The Diocese of Scranton was created the year before his ordination and he accepted an invitation from Bishop William O'Hara to work in that diocese.

Priesthood
Garvey was ordained a priest on September 22, 1869 by Bishop O'Hara. His first assignment was as assistant pastor at the largely German-speaking parish of St. Mary's Church in Honesdale, with the additional duty of serving the English-speaking Catholics of St. Philomena's Church in Hawley. A year later in 1870, he was named pastor of Holy Ghost Church in Athens.

In December 1871, Garvey was appointed to replace Rev. Michael P. Stack as pastor of the Church of the Annunciation in Williamsport. Stack had been removed from his position by Bishop O'Hara due to his mismanagement of parish affairs, and subsequently spent the next decade in court fighting against the bishop. Despite taking charge amid a contentious situation, Garvey eliminated the parish's debt and built a new church, rectory, and parochial school, as well as Mount Carmel Cemetery and a convent for the Sisters of the Immaculate Heart of Mary.

After 27 years at Williamsport, Garvey became vicar general of the Diocese of Scranton and pastor of St. John's Church in Pittston in March 1899. He was given the title of monsignor by Pope Leo XIII in 1900. Before his eventual appointment as bishop, his name had been proposed to succeed Bishop O'Hara of Scranton, Bishop Thomas McGovern of Harrisburg, and Bishop Tobias Mullen of Erie.

Bishop of Altoona
On May 31, 1901, Garvey was appointed the first bishop of the newly created Diocese of Altoona by Pope Leo XIII. He received his episcopal consecration on the following September 8 from Archbishop Sebastiano Martinelli, with Bishops Michael John Hoban and John Edmund Fitzmaurice serving as co-consecrators, at St. Peter's Cathedral in Scranton. He served as Bishop for 19 years, until his death at age 75.

Garvey formally took charge of the Diocese of Altoona on September 24, 1901, when he was installed at St. John's Pro-Cathedral. The new diocese covered over 6,000 square miles in Central and Western Pennsylvania, including the counties of Cambria, Blair, Bedford, Huntingdon, and Somerset taken from the Diocese of Pittsburgh and the counties of Centre, Clinton, and Fulton taken from the Diocese of Harrisburg.

In Garvey's first full year as bishop in 1902, the Diocese of Altoona contained 59 priests, 44 parishes, 23 parochial schools with 6,000 students, and a Catholic population of 44,000. By his final year as bishop in 1920, there were 148 priests, 91 parishes, 42 parochial schools with 11,369 students, and a Catholic population of 123,756.

Garvey's health began to fail in 1917, and three years later he received Bishop John Joseph McCort as a coadjutor bishop with the right of succession. Nine months after McCort's appointment, Garvey collapsed and fell into a coma. He died a few days later at his residence on October 22, 1920, aged 75.

References

1845 births
1920 deaths
St. Charles College alumni
St. Charles Borromeo Seminary alumni
People from Lackawanna County, Pennsylvania
20th-century Roman Catholic bishops in the United States
Catholics from Pennsylvania